Finch–Kennedy GO Station (also referred to as Finch East) is a planned commuter train station in Toronto, Ontario, Canada. The station is one of five GO stations to be built as part of the SmartTrack Stations Program to adapt regional commuter service for urban public transit. Construction will start in 2022 for completion in 2026.

A grade separation will be built prior to the construction of the station. The station will be located between Midland Avenue and Milliken Boulevard, and the station's main building on the north side of Finch Avenue East, on the east side of the railway right-of-way. The station will have two side platforms with canopies and heated shelters. From a new signalized intersection at Baylawn Drive and Finch Avenue, a new access road will provide vehicular access to the main station building where an accessible pedestrian pickup/drop-off area and bicycle parking will be located. Finch Avenue will be widened to six lanes under the railway bridge. The two curb lanes will be for buses only, able to accommodate three articulated buses in each direction. Bus riders from either direction can access either station platform via four access points below the railway bridge, each access point having stairs and an elevator. In addition to the six lanes, there will be pedestrian sidewalks and bicycle lanes under the bridge. The station will have a service building on the west side of the tracks opposite the main station building.

The following TTC bus routes are expected to serve the new station:
 39 Finch East
 339 Finch East Night Bus
 939 Finch Express
 57 Midland

References

External links
 Stouffville GO Expansion – Metrolinx

Future GO Transit railway stations
Proposed railway stations in Canada
Transport in Toronto